Ron Watson (born 18 May 1937) is a New Zealand sailor. He competed at the 1960 Summer Olympics and the 1972 Summer Olympics.

References

External links
 

1937 births
Living people
New Zealand male sailors (sport)
Olympic sailors of New Zealand
Sailors at the 1960 Summer Olympics – Flying Dutchman
Sailors at the 1972 Summer Olympics – Dragon
Sportspeople from Auckland